Euphorbia actinoclada is a species of plant in the family Euphorbiaceae. It is endemic to Kenya, Somalia, and Ethiopia.
As most other succulent members of the genus Euphorbia, its trade is regulated under Appendix II of CITES.

References

actinoclada
actinoclada